Bugryshikha is a rural locality (a selo) and the administrative center of Bugryshikhinsky Selsoviet, Kuryinsky District, Altai Krai, Russia. The population was 74 as of 2013. There are 5 streets.

Geography 
Bugryshikha is located 70 km southeast of Kurya (the district's administrative centre) by road. Posyolok imeni 8 Marta is the nearest rural locality.

References 

Rural localities in Kuryinsky District